(born May 10, 1974) is a Japanese mixed martial artist competing in the welterweight division. A student of former Shooto competitor Noboru Asahi, he has competed in Shooto, Cage Force, and the UFC. On December 1, 2007, he became the first Cage Force welterweight tournament winner.

Career

Early career
In 2007, Yoshida was entered into a Cage Force welterweight tournament sponsored by the Worldwide Cage Network.  In the opening round of the tournament, Yoshida defeated two-time interim Pancrase champion Katsuya Inoue by knockout.  He went on to defeat Matt Cain in the quarterfinals and former Shooto champion Akira Kikuchi in the semi-finals of the tournament.  In the finals, Yoshida defeated Dan Hardy by disqualification after being struck by a kick to the groin, becoming the first Cage Force welterweight tournament winner.

Ultimate Fighting Championship
After the tournament's closing, Yoshida was offered a contract with the Ultimate Fighting Championship.  It was originally speculated that the winners of the Cage Force tournaments were to be selected to compete in the UFC's active roster.  Yoshida made his debut in the UFC at UFC 84, choking The Ultimate Fighter 6 contestant Jon Koppenhaver unconscious by Anaconda choke submission.
He was scheduled to meet Karo Parisyan in September at UFC 88 but Parisyan pulled out of the bout only two hours before the weigh-ins citing an injury. Yoshida then faced Josh Koscheck at UFC: Fight for the Troops on December 10, 2008, a fight which he lost by 1st round knockout.  Unfortunately for Yoshida, the first knockout punch from Koscheck occurred with Yoshida's back against the cage, preventing Yoshida from falling down, allowing Koscheck to land another devastating haymaker on Yoshida's jaw, sending him crashing to the canvas in a motionless heap. UFC reported, "Yoshida, who remained on the canvas while being tended to by commission doctors, was removed from the Octagon on a stretcher as a precautionary measure. He was later treated and released from a local hospital for a concussion".

Yoshida then fought Brandon Wolff at UFC 98: Evans vs. Machida on May 23, 2009 and won the bout by guillotine choke in the first round.

Yoshida's fought against Anthony Johnson at UFC 104. The fight became a catchweight bout of 176 when Johnson missed weight by six pounds, Yoshida (weighed in at 170 lb) agreed to fight at catchweight. Yoshida lost by first round TKO.

Yoshida then faced Mike Guymon on May 8, 2010 at UFC 113. Yoshida lost to Guymon by unanimous decision, losing all three rounds.

After losing to Guymon and dropping his UFC record to 2-3, Yoshida was released from the UFC.

Bellator Fighting Championships
Yoshida made his debut for Bellator Fighting Championships on September 30, 2010 against Chris Lozano.  He lost via corner stoppage between rounds 2 and 3 due to a severely swollen eye.

ONE Championship
On July 18 it was announced that Yoshida would be facing Pride FC, Elite XC, Strikeforce and UFC veteran Phil Baroni at ONE Fighting Championship: Champion vs. Champion at the Singapore Indoor Stadium on September 3.  He won the fight via unanimous decision.

BAMMA
Yoshida was expected to face Nate Marquardt in the main event of BAMMA 9 to determine an Inaugural World Welterweight Champion. However, on January 13, 2012, Marquardt was released from his contract with BAMMA officially due to the promotion pushing back BAMMA 9, and therefore his promotional debut, to March 24, 2012. Sources close to the situation believe that the release was due to the promotion not being able to afford the fighter's contract.

Titan Fighting Championship
Yoshida was expected make his Titan Fighting Championships debut against Mike Ricci for the vacant Titan FC Lightweight Championship at Titan FC 31 on October 31, 2014. However, Ricci failed to make weight prior to the fight. Both men agreed to fight in a non-title 157 lb catchweight fight instead. However, Titan FC's Chief Operating Officer, Lex McMahon, announced that Yoshida was refusing to fight just hours before the event, forcing the cancellation of the fight entirely. Yoshida was immediately released from the promotion.

Mixed martial arts record

|-
| Loss
| align=center| 18–9
| Yoshiyuki Katahira
| Decision (split)
| Deep: Cage Impact 2016: Deep vs. WSOF-GC
| 
| align=center| 3
| align=center| 5:00
| Tokyo, Japan
|
|-
| Win
| align=center| 18–8
| Kimihiro Eto
| TKO (punches)
| Deep: 73 Impact
| 
| align=center| 3
| align=center| 2:19
| Tokyo, Japan
|
|-
| Loss
| align=center| 17–8
| Kota Shimoishi
| Decision (unanimous)
| Deep: Osaka Impact 2015
| 
| align=center| 3
| align=center| 5:00
| Osaka, Japan
|
|-
| Loss
| align=center| 17–7
| Satoru Kitaoka
| Decision (unanimous)
| Deep - Dream Impact 2014: Omisoka Special
| 
| align=center| 3
| align=center| 5:00
| Saitama, Japan
| For Deep Lightweight Title
|-
| Win
| align=center| 17–6
| Shigetoshi Iwase
| Decision (unanimous)
| Deep: 65 Impact
| 
| align=center| 2
| align=center| 5:00
| Tokyo, Japan
| 
|-
| Win
| align=center| 16–6
| Won Sik Park
| Submission (rear-naked choke)
| DEEP: Cage Impact 2013
| 
| align=center| 2
| align=center| 4:46
| Tokyo, Japan
| 
|-
| Win
| align=center| 15–6
| Niko Puhakka
| Submission (guillotine choke)
| Fight Festival 32
| 
| align=center| 3
| align=center| N/A
| Helsinki, Finland
| 
|-
| Win
| align=center| 14–6
| Jeremy Hamilton
| Submission (rear-naked choke)
| CFX 33: Minnesota vs. Japan
| 
| align=center| 2
| align=center| 3:37
| Minneapolis, Minnesota United States
| 
|-
| Win
| align=center| 13–6
| Phil Baroni
| Decision (unanimous)
| ONE Fighting Championship 1: Champion vs. Champion
| 
| align=center| 3
| align=center| 5:00
| Kallang, Singapore
| 
|-
| Win
| align=center| 12–6
| Ferrid Kheder
| TKO (punches) 
| Fighting Marcou Arena 2
| 
| align=center| 1
| align=center| 3:44
| Herault, France
| 
|-
| Loss
| align=center| 11–6
| Chris Lozano
| TKO (corner stoppage)
| Bellator 31
| 
| align=center| 2
| align=center| 5:00
| Lake Charles, Louisiana, United States
| 
|-
| Loss
| align=center| 11–5
| Mike Guymon
| Decision (unanimous)
| UFC 113
| 
| align=center| 3
| align=center| 5:00
| Montreal, Quebec, Canada
| 
|-
| Loss
| align=center| 11–4
| Anthony Johnson
| TKO (punches)
| UFC 104
| 
| align=center| 1
| align=center| 0:41
| Los Angeles, California, United States
| |176 lb. catchweight bout
|-
| Win
| align=center| 11–3
| Brandon Wolff
| Submission (guillotine choke)
| UFC 98
| 
| align=center| 1
| align=center| 2:24
| Las Vegas, Nevada, United States
| 
|-
| Loss
| align=center| 10–3
| Josh Koscheck
| KO (punch)
| UFC: Fight for the Troops
| 
| align=center| 1
| align=center| 2:15
| Fayetteville, North Carolina, United States
| 
|-
| Win
| align=center| 10–2
| War Machine
| Technical Submission (anaconda choke)
| UFC 84
| 
| align=center| 1
| align=center| 0:56
| Las Vegas, Nevada, United States
| 
|-
| Win
| align=center| 9–2
| Dan Hardy
| DQ (accidental kick to the groin)
| GCM: Cage Force 5
| 
| align=center| 2
| align=center| 0:04
| Tokyo, Japan
| GCM welterweight final
|-
| Win
| align=center| 8–2
| Akira Kikuchi
| TKO (elbows)
| GCM: Cage Force 4
| 
| align=center| 1
| align=center| 4:33
| Tokyo, Japan
| GCM welterweight semi-final
|-
| Win
| align=center| 7–2
| Matt Cain
| TKO (punches)
| GCM: Cage Force EX Eastern Bound
| 
| align=center| 1
| align=center| 2:59
| Tokyo, Japan
| GCM welterweight quarter-final
|-
| Win
| align=center| 6–2
| Katsuya Inoue
| KO (punches)
| GCM: Cage Force 2
| 
| align=center| 1
| align=center| 1:45
| Tokyo, Japan
| GCM welterweight qualifier
|-
| Win
| align=center| 5–2
| Asato Hashimoto
| TKO (elbow injury)
| GCM: Cage Force 1
| 
| align=center| 1
| align=center| 0:35
| Tokyo, Japan
| 
|-
| Win
| align=center| 4–2
| Hossein Ojaghi
| Submission (armbar)
| GCM: D.O.G. 7
| 
| align=center| 2
| align=center| 3:36
| Tokyo, Japan
| 
|-
| Win
| align=center| 3–2
| Luis Santos
| TKO (corner stoppage)
| Kokoro: Kill Or Be Killed
| 
| align=center| 1
| align=center| 5:00
| Tokyo, Japan
| 
|-
| Win
| align=center| 2–2
| Mindaugas Smirnovas
| TKO (punches)
| Shooto: 3/24 in Korakuen Hall
| 
| align=center| 1
| align=center| 4:00
| Tokyo, Japan
| 
|-
| Loss
| align=center| 1–2
| Keita Nakamura
| Technical Decision (majority)
| Shooto: 12/17 in Shinjuku Face
| 
| align=center| 2
| align=center| 4:06
| Tokyo, Japan
| 
|-
| Loss
| align=center| 1–1
| Yoshitaro Niimi
| Decision (majority)
| Shooto: Shooter's Summer
| 
| align=center| 2
| align=center| 5:00
| Tokyo, Japan
| 
|-
| Win
| align=center| 1–0
| Akihiro Yamazaki
| Decision (unanimous)
| Shooto: 2/6 in Kitazawa Town Hall
| 
| align=center| 2
| align=center| 5:00
| Tokyo, Japan
| 
|-

Submission grappling record
KO PUNCHES
|- style="text-align:center; background:#f0f0f0;"
| style="border-style:none none solid solid; "|Result
| style="border-style:none none solid solid; "|Opponent
| style="border-style:none none solid solid; "|Method
| style="border-style:none none solid solid; "|Event
| style="border-style:none none solid solid; "|Date
| style="border-style:none none solid solid; "|Round
| style="border-style:none none solid solid; "|Time
| style="border-style:none none solid solid; "|Notes
|-
|Loss|| Sotaro Yamada || Submission (reverse neck crank) || rowspan=2| Quintet Fight Night 2 || rowspan=2| February 3, 2019 || 1|| 3:51||
|-
|Draw|| Daisuke Nakamura || Draw || 1|| 10:00||
|-

See also
 List of Bellator MMA alumni
 List of ONE Championship alumni

References and footnotes

See also
List of male mixed martial artists

External links

1974 births
Living people
Japanese expatriate sportspeople in the United States
Japanese male judoka
Japanese male mixed martial artists
Mixed martial artists utilizing judo
Sportspeople from Tokyo
Welterweight mixed martial artists
Ultimate Fighting Championship male fighters